Narayanpur Bad is a village in Uttar Pradesh, India. It comes under the Hasanpur Baru gram panchayat. The village is located in the Sadabad block of in Hathras district, 2 km north of Hasanpur Baru.

References 

Villages in Hathras district